The Women's 1m Springboard event at the 2010 South American Games was held on March 20 at 14:15.

Medalists

Results

References
Summary

1m W